Shadows Run Black is a 1984 erotic crime thriller directed by Howard Heard and starring Kevin Costner.

The film follows a tough Los Angeles detective as he races against time to discover who is behind a string of brutal serial slayings. Costner plays the film's main suspect.

Cast
 Kevin Costner as Jimmy Scott
 William J. Kulzer as Rydell King 
 Elizabeth Trosper as Judy Cole (credited as Elizabeth Carroll Trosper) 
 Shea Porter as Morgan Cole
 George Engelson as Priest (credited as George J. Engelson)
 Dianne Hinkler as Helen Cole
 Julius Metoyer as Billy Tovar
 Terry Congie as Lee Faulkner
 Lee Bishop as Police Officer

Critical reception 
Allmovie called the film "execrable" and an "exploitational slice-n-dicer masquerading as a police thriller".

References

External links

 

1984 films
American independent films
Troma Entertainment films
American slasher films
1980s crime thriller films
1980s slasher films
1980s English-language films
1980s American films